The Twelve Apostles are a collection of limestone stacks off the shore of Port Campbell National Park, by the Great Ocean Road in Victoria, Australia.

Their proximity to one another has made the site a popular tourist attraction. Seven of the original eight stacks remain standing at the Twelve Apostles viewpoint, after one collapsed in July 2005. Though the view from the promontory by the Twelve Apostles never included twelve stacks, additional stacks—not considered part of the Apostles group—are located to the west within the national park.

Formation and history

The limestone unit that forms The Twelve Apostles is referred to as the Port Campbell Limestone, which was deposited in the Mid-Late Miocene, around 15 to 5 million years ago.

The Twelve Apostles were formed by erosion. The stacks are susceptible to further erosion from waves. In July 2005, a  stack collapsed, leaving seven standing at the Twelve Apostles viewpoint. Due to wave action eroding the cliffs, existing headlands are expected to become new limestone stacks in the future.

The stacks were originally known as the Pinnacles, and the Sow and Pigs (or Sow and Piglets, with Muttonbird Island being the Sow and the smaller rock stacks being the Piglets), as well as the Twelve Apostles. The formation's name was made official as the Twelve Apostles, despite only ever having had eight stacks.

In 2002, the Port Campbell Professional Fishermens Association attempted to block the creation of the Twelve Apostles Marine National Park at the Twelve Apostles site. The association approved of a later decision by the Victorian government to prohibit seismic exploration at the site by Benaris Energy, believing such exploration would harm marine life.

See also 
 Gibson Steps
 London Arch (formerly London Bridge)
 Loch Ard Gorge

References

External links 

 

Stacks of Australia
Landmarks in Australia
Rock formations of Victoria (Australia)
Tourist attractions in Victoria (Australia)
Cliffs of Australia
Great Ocean Road